The 2017 Arizona Wildcats baseball team represented the University of Arizona in the 2017 NCAA Division I baseball season. The Wildcats played their home games for the 6th season at Hi Corbett Field. The team was coached by Jay Johnson in his 2nd season at Arizona.

Personnel

Roster

Coaches

Opening day

Schedule and results

Lubbock Regional

2017 MLB Draft

References

Arizona Wildcats
Arizona Wildcats baseball seasons
2017 in sports in Arizona
2017 NCAA Division I baseball tournament participants